Georges André (26 July 1876 – 19 March 1945) was a French curler who won bronze at the Winter Olympics 1924. In the four-man bobsleigh competition of the same Olympics he was fourth.

External links 
 

Olympic curlers of France
French male curlers
Olympic bobsledders of France
French male bobsledders
Curlers at the 1924 Winter Olympics
Bobsledders at the 1924 Winter Olympics
1876 births
1945 deaths
Medalists at the 1924 Winter Olympics